Philodromus monitae is a spider species found in Greece.

See also 
 List of Philodromidae species

References

External links 

monitae
Spiders of Europe
Spiders described in 2010